Naptown Roller Derby (NRD) is a women's flat-track roller derby league based in Indianapolis, Indiana. Founded in 2006, the league started their 10th season in March 2016. Naptown Roller Derby is a member of the Women's Flat Track Derby Association (WFTDA). The home bouts of Naptown Roller Derby are held at the Indiana State Fairgrounds in Indianapolis.

League history
Naptown Roller Girls first formed in 2006, with ad hoc practices in public spaces, and first held a competitive bout in 2007. Naptown was announced as a member of the WFTDA in December 2007. By early 2008 NRG was repeatedly selling out events at the Indiana State Fairgrounds, with nearly 4,500 in attendance on February 9 of that year. Naptown's top attendance mark was 4,978 at the Pepsi Coliseum with average attendance of 3,500 as of 2011.

In 2009, Naptown was the host league for the WFTDA North Central Regional Tournament "Monumental Mayhem', held at the Indiana Convention Center.

In January 2017, the league announced it had changed its name to Naptown Roller Derby as part of an effort to be an "inclusive and supportive environment for skaters and staff."

Teams
The league is composed of three teams at different levels of competitive play: The Tornado Sirens (A-Team), The Warning Belles (B-team) and The Third Alarm (C-team).

WFTDA competition

Naptown's WFTDA A team, the Tornado Sirens, has consistently qualified for WFTDA Playoffs at various levels since 2010, including appearances at WFTDA Championships in 2011 and 2012. Naptown qualified for the WFTDA Division 2 Playoffs and Championship in 2017 as the twelfth seed in Pittsburgh, and finished in third place with a 215-144 victory over Dublin Roller Derby. In 2018 the league declined invitation to the WFTDA Playoffs, citing the cost of travel.

Rankings

 DNP = did not play

In the community
Local brewery Sun King Brewing produces an American brown ale for Naptown called "Naptown Brown".

References

External links

Official Website

Roller derby leagues in Indiana
Women's sports in the United States
Sports competitions in Indianapolis
Women's Flat Track Derby Association Division 2
Roller derby leagues established in 2006
2006 establishments in Indiana